Circumpolar peoples and Arctic peoples are umbrella terms for the various indigenous peoples of the Arctic.

Prehistory
The earliest inhabitants of North America's central and eastern Arctic are referred to as the Arctic small tool tradition (AST) and existed c. 2500 BC. AST consisted of several Paleo-Eskimo cultures, including the Independence cultures and Pre-Dorset culture. The Dorset culture (Inuktitut: Tuniit or Tunit) refers to the next inhabitants of central and eastern Arctic. The Dorset culture evolved because of technological and economic changes during the period of 1050–550 BC. With the exception of the Quebec/Labrador peninsula, the Dorset culture vanished around 1500 AD.

Dorset/Thule culture transition dates around the 9th–10th centuries. Scientists theorize that there may have been cross-contact of the two cultures with sharing of technology, such as fashioning harpoon heads, or the Thule may have found Dorset remnants and adapted their ways with the predecessor culture. Others believe the Thule displaced the Dorset.

Historical and contemporary peoples
By 1300, the Inuit, present-day Arctic inhabitants and descendants of Thule culture, had settled in west Greenland, and moved into east Greenland over the following century. Over time, the Inuit have migrated throughout the Arctic regions of Canada, Greenland, Russia and the United States.

Other Circumpolar North Indigenous peoples include the Chukchi, Evenks, Inupiat, Khanty, Koryaks, Nenets, Sami, Yukaghir, and Yupik. Yupik People still refer to themselves as Eskimo which means "snowshoe netters", not "raw meat eaters" as it is sometimes mistakenly translated.

List of peoples by ethnolinguistic grouping

Ancient Beringian - Siberia and Alaska
Chukotko-Kamchatkan
Chukchi, Siberia (Chukotka Autonomous Okrug), Russia
Koryaks, Siberia (Kamchatka Krai), Russia 
Tungusic
Evenks, China (Inner Mongolia and Heilongjiang), Mongolia, Russia
Evens, Siberia (Magadan Oblast, Kamchatka Krai and Sakha), Russia
Turkic
Northeast Turkic
Dolgans, Siberia (Krasnoyarsk Krai), Russia
Yakuts, Siberia (Sakha), Russia
Eskimo-Aleut
Eskimo
Yupik: Alaska and the Russian Far East (Chukotka Autonomous Okrug)
Alutiiq, Alaska
Central Alaskan Yup'ik, Alaska
Cup'ik, Alaska
Cup'ig, Nunivak Island (Alaska)
Siberian Yupik, Siberia (Chukotka Autonomous Okrug), Russia
Inuit: Greenland, Northern Canada (Nunavut, Nunavik, Nunatsiavut, Northwest Territories (Inuvik Region) and Yukon), Alaska, United States
Kalaallit, Greenland
Iñupiat: Northwest Arctic and North Slope boroughs and the Bering Straits, Alaska, United States
Aleut: Aleutian Islands, Alaska, United States and Kamchatka Krai, Russia
Uralic
Finno-Ugric
Permian
Komi, Russia (Komi Republic and Perm Krai)
Udmurt, Russia 
Sami: Northern Norway, Sweden, Finland, Russia (Murmansk Oblast)
Balto-Finnic
Finns, Finland, Norway
Karelians, Finland, Russia
Samoyedic
Nenets, Russia
Enets, Siberia (Krasnoyarsk Krai), Russia
Nganasan,  Siberia (Krasnoyarsk Krai), Russia
Selkup, Siberia, Russia
Yukaghirs, East Siberia, Russia
Indo-European
Germanic
North Germanic
Icelanders, Iceland
Norwegians, Norway
Swedes, Sweden
Slavic
East Slavic
 Pomors and other Russians, Russia

See also
Indigenous peoples of Siberia
Indigenous peoples of the Subarctic
Inuit Circumpolar Council

References

Bibliography
Takashi Irimoto, Takako Yamada (eds.) Circumpolar Religion and Ecology: An Anthropology of the North, University of Tokyo Press, 1994, .

 
Culture of the Arctic
Society of the Arctic